Kirchberg am Walde is a town in the district of Gmünd in Lower Austria, Austria.

The Austrian operatic bass Johann Michael Weinkopf was born here in 1780.

References

Cities and towns in Gmünd District